Damonsville is a town in Bojanala District Municipality in the North West province of South Africa. It may be seen as a multiracial suburb of the town Brits.

References

Populated places in the Madibeng Local Municipality